

Emery Point Light is an active lighthouse located at Larrakeyah Barracks, the main base for the Australian Defence Force in Northern Territory, Australia, at the entrance to Port Darwin. It was the second lighthouse to be built in Port Darwin. It was the only navigational aid to remain functional in the path of Cyclone Tracy.

History

The first light at Emery Point was established in 1900, and dismantled in May 1915, in preparation for the installation of the current lighthouse, which was installed later that year. Its construction was part of the "Golden Age of Australian Lighthouses", taking place between 1913 and 1920.

The original light source was a carbide lamp (acetylene gas lamp). It was converted to electric power on 23 March 1966, with an acetylene gas standby. The current light source is a  1,000 watt tungsten-halogen lamp.

In Christmas Eve of 1974, Cyclone Tracy hit the city of Darwin. Emery Point Light was the only navigational aid to remain functional in the path of the storm.

Over the years, the light characteristic shown was changed. The original characteristic was an occulting light, with an eclipse of 1.5 seconds every six seconds (Oc. 6s).
The current light characteristic shown is three flashes, one every two seconds, repeating every 15 seconds (Fl.(3)W.R. 15s). The color is red on -181° and white on 335°-139°.

Emery Point
Emery Point was originally called Goondal. It was named after a Lieutenant Emery, who discovered fresh water at the base of the cliff.

Structure
The current tower, dating from 1915, is a square metal skeletal tower, painted white, topped with a lantern.

Visiting and operation
The site and the tower are inside a military base and are closed to the public, though a sea view is possible. The light is operated by the Darwin Port Corporation.

See also

 List of lighthouses in Australia

Notes

References

 
 
  reprinted in

External links

 

Lighthouses completed in 1900
Lighthouses completed in 1915
Lighthouses in the Northern Territory